The 1st Battalion, 161st Field Artillery Regiment is a Field Artillery battalion of the Kansas Army National Guard in Kansas.  Like many National Guard field artillery battalions, it is the sole battalion in the regiment.  The battalion is currently headquartered in Hutchinson, and consists of three firing batteries: Alpha (Dodge City), Bravo (Abilene), Charlie (Newton), and a Headquarters Battery (Hutchinson). The battalion has a direct support relationship with the 1161st Forward Support Company (Wichita & Pratt). The battalion's higher headquarters is the 130th Field Artillery Brigade (Manhattan).

History
The 1-161 FA has its roots as the 2nd Infantry Regiment of the Kansas Volunteer Militia, which was organized from existing units in 1880. The regiment was mustered into federal service in June 1916 for duty guarding the Mexican Border against invasion. The regiment served for 5 months at Eagle Pass, Texas.  In August 1917, the 2nd Infantry Regiment was drafted into federal service and in October of that same year, was consolidated with the 1st Infantry Regiment and re-designated the 137th Infantry, Kansas National Guard and assigned to the 35th Division.  The regiment saw duty in France and participated in the Meuse-Argonne offensive. They were demobilized in May 1919, after 34 months of active duty service. In November 1921, the 2nd Infantry Regiment was re-designated as the 161st Field Artillery Regiment and assigned to the 35th Division.  In December 1940 the regiment was inducted into federal service. In December 1941, the regiment, along with the rest of the 35th Division, was moved to California to defend against possible Japanese invasion. On 1 March 1942, the regiment was divided into the 161st Field Artillery Battalion (the former 1st Battalion), assigned to the 35th Infantry Division, and the 2nd Battalion, 195th Field Artillery Regiment (the former 2nd Battalion), which became a separate unit.  The 35th Division began training in April 1943 at Fort Rucker, AL. The division arrived in England in May 1944, and returned to the United States in November 1945. From 1946 to 1998, the 161st's designation was changed nine times from regiment to battalion, with various naming conventions. In March 1996, 1st Battalion, 161st Field Artillery converted from M110 8-inch howitzers to M109A5 howitzers but continued as a general support battalion of the 35th Infantry Division Artillery. During the same reorganization, Battery F, 161st Field Artillery was organized as a separate 8-inch general support battery of the division artillery.

In 2001, the battalion was mobilized for Operation Noble Eagle and provided force protection and gate security at McConnell AFB, Fort Leavenworth and Fort Riley.  Members of Bravo Battery, which was based out of Pratt, were deployed in 2005 to Iraq in support of Operation Iraqi Freedom. One Soldier lost his life while serving in Iraq.  The battery returned in July 2007.  That same month, the rest of the battalion was notified that they would be deployed to Iraq. In October of that year Headquarters Battery, Alpha Battery, Charlie Battery and the 1161st FSC began pre-mobilization training and deployed in February 2008. Headquarters Battery was sent to Baghdad, while the remainder of the Battalion, with reinforcements from Battery E 161st Field Artillery, were sent to FOB Grizzly to provide force protection. One soldier, Specialist Ronald Schmidt stationed in FOB Grizzly, lost his life on that deployment as well.  The battalion was again mobilized in February 2011 for deployment to Camp Lemonnier in Djibouti. The battalion deployed with full strength, augmented with both Battery E, 1161st FSC, and the 35th Military Police Company. They returned to the United States in February 2012.

In June 2018, Charlie Battery deployed in support of Operation Spartan Shield with the 155 ABCT as a battery in the 2-114 FA. The battery deployed contingents to the Kingdom of Saudi Arabia, Iraq, and Syria and returned in March 2019. Subsequently, Charlie Battery was awarded the 2019 Alexander Hamilton Award as the best battery in the US Army National Guard.

References

Adjutant General's Department News Article
The Institute of Heraldry
35th ID in WWI

161
F 161
Military units and formations established in 1921